The American University Washington College of Law (AUWCL or WCL) is the law school of American University, a private research university in Washington, D.C. It is located on the western side of Tenley Circle in the Tenleytown section of northwest Washington, D.C.  The school is accredited by the American Bar Association and a member of the AALS.

WCL is ranked 73rd in the nation in the Best Law Schools by U.S. News & World Report, and has highly ranked specialty programs in Clinical Training (#3), Trial Advocacy (#3), Part-Time Law (#5), International Law (#7), Intellectual Property (#8), and Health Care Law (#16).

Begun in 1896, WCL was the first law school founded by women, the first with a female dean, and the first to graduate an all-female class.

History

Early beginnings
Ellen Spencer Mussey and Emma Gillett began teaching in Mussey's law offices in 1898 after they were approached by three women who wished to study with them.  Not originally intending to create a full-fledged law school, they requested the law school of Columbian College to accept the six women for their final year. When Columbian refused the request on the ground that "women did not have the mentality for law," the two women became determined to complete the students' education themselves and found a co-educational law school that was specifically open to women. Although Gillett was a graduate of Howard University School of Law, Washington College of Law only accepted white applicants.

With its first graduating class, the Washington College of Law became the first law school founded by women, the first with a female dean, and the first law school to graduate an all-female class.  Mussey's male law clerk enrolled in 1897, making the school officially coeducational.

Continuing growth
Washington D.C. incorporated WCL in 1898.  After several temporary locations, the school moved to the Le Droit Building on 8th & F Streets in 1900. Enrollment rose to 55 students by 1908 and doubled in five years to 128 students.  Dean Mussey secured a lease in 1909 in the Chesley Building on New York Ave until the school outgrew the six-classroom lease.  The school moved to its first permanent home in 1920, the former residence of Robert G. Ingersoll on K Street.  Continually growing, WCL moved in 1924 to the former home of Oscar Underwood and former residence of Archibald Butt.  WCL merged with American University in 1949 and graduated its first African American student in 1953.

The Women & the Law Program was launched in 1948, to promote the integration of women's rights and gender studies into legal education, practice and doctrine.

After years of work by Dean Myers, the John Sherman Myers Law School building was constructed on the American University main campus and dedicated in 1963 by Chief Justice Earl Warren.  In the same year, U.S. Senator Robert Byrd (D-W.Va.) graduated from WCL after ten years of night-study classes, the first time a sitting member of Congress had begun and completed a law degree while serving.

By 1988, WCL had grown to over 1,000 students.  Dean Milstein pushed for a new building, and in 1996 WCL moved less than a mile to The John Sherman Myers and Alvina Reckman Myers Law Center on Massachusetts Avenue in the American University Park section of Northwest Washington, D.C.  The building was two and a half times larger than the previous Myers building and included the new Pence Law Library.

Move to Tenley Campus
In April 2012, the D.C. Zoning Commission approved the plans for American University Washington College of Law to relocate from Spring Valley to American University's Tenley Campus. The approval of plans for further processing and zoning variances for the law school was handed down after American University's full campus plan was approved in March. Construction began in the summer of 2013, with the relocation of the law school to the new campus completed in early 2016.  Spring 2016 semester classes began at the new campus on January 11, 2016.

Campus and facilities
The Washington College of Law is located on American University's Tenley Campus at 4300 Nebraska Avenue NW. on the northwest edge of Washington, DC, approximately 1 mile from the Maryland state line.  Construction on the Tenley Campus was completed in early 2016 and included three primary buildings:

 Capital Hall - Historically preserved and renovated, this building includes administrative offices, student publications, four courtrooms, two classrooms, and an atrium.
 Warren Building - Brand new construction, housing the Pence Law Library on two and a half floors, nine classrooms, the ceremonial courtroom, an active learning lab, and a roof deck.
 Yuma Building - Brand new construction, housing 13 classrooms, faculty offices, clinical and international programs, dining, and Claudio Grossman Hall, which seats 500.

The law school campus is less than a mile from the main American University campus; however, a shuttle system is available for students and staff to travel between the two locations.   The campus is accessible to students and faculty 24/7 with the use of an AU ID card.

Pence Law Library
The library is open 24 hours a day, seven days a week to students and faculty with the use of an AU ID card.

The library collection includes European Community and US government depositories and the Baxter Collection in International Law. Students and faculty also have access to the university's library, the Library of Congress, specialized agency libraries, and other area law libraries electronically.

The National Jurist placed WCL's Library 41st out of 199 in its Best Law Libraries ranking.

Academics
WCL's Master of Laws (LL.M.) program ranked 13th nationally in the 2012 AUAP rankings. The Brian Leiter Law School rankings placed the WCL 47th in the 2012 Top 70 Law Faculties in Scholarly Impact. National Jurist ranked WCL the fifth best law school for Hispanic students in 2008. It ranked WCL the 4th best public interest law school in the nation.

U.S. News & World Report ranks WCL 73rd in the nation among the 197 ranked schools. WCL's clinical training and trial advocacy programs are each ranked 3rd nationally while its part-time law program (5th), international law (7th), intellectual property law (8th), and health care law (16th) offerings are also ranked highly.

The school maintains programs in both human rights and public interest law.  WCL's Equal Justice Foundation (EJF) provides scholarships to students who obtain unpaid summer internships with public interest organizations.

Enrollment
In 2021, the school had an acceptance rate of 37.94%. The 75th, 50th and 25th percentile undergraduate GPAs were 3.71, 3.57 and 3.39 respectively, while LSAT percentiles were 163, 161 and 157 respectively.

There was 36% minority representation and 64% female representation in the 2021 entering class, with representation from 42 states and 28 countries.

Degrees offered
WCL offers the Juris Doctor (J.D.), Master of Laws (LL.M.) in either international or constitutional law, and Doctor of Juridical Science (S.J.D.) degrees. The Washington College of Law now offers an online Master of Legal Studies degree.

Additionally, students can enroll in one of several dual degree programs:

Clinical program

WCL's clinical program is one of the most comprehensive in the nation.  The school was one of the first law schools to develop a modern clinical legal education program.  With over 200 students participating in the 11 clinics every year, the program is one of the largest in the country.

The clinic serves various clients, including immigrants and refugees, victims/survivors of domestic violence, juveniles, criminal defendants, low-income taxpayers, individuals seeking help with family law, consumer, disability, and intellectual property issues, community groups, and nonprofit organizations.

Clinics include the General Practice Clinic, Community and Economic Development Law Clinic, Criminal Justice Clinic, DC Law Students in Court Clinic, Disability Rights Law Clinic, Domestic Violence Law Clinic, Janet R. Spragens Federal Tax Clinic, Glushko-Samuelson Intellectual Property Law Clinic, Immigrant Justice Clinic, International Human Rights Law Clinic, and Women and the Law Clinic.

Study abroad programs

WCL's study abroad program is considered to be among the best in the country, with 30% of the student body studying abroad every year.  In 2012, the National Jurist recognized it as one of the "most robust study abroad programs out of the 200 U.S. Law Schools."

Students can study law for a semester in over 20 countries.  WCL also offers summer abroad programs in London, Paris, Brussels, Geneva, and The Hague.

Programs and centers

WCL participates in several popular study-abroad and student exchange programs with universities worldwide.

In 2002, the Jessup Moot Court Team was the top-ranked team in the United States and third in the World.

Online programs 

WCL offers an online Master of Legal Studies (MLS) created for professionals who have law-related responsibilities. The MLS program provides professionals in a variety of industries with an understanding of the U.S. legal system, but it is not meant for students who want to become a practicing attorney. The program offers the following concentration tracks: General MLS, Business, Health Care Compliance, and Technology. Each concentration features fundamental legal training and industry-specific knowledge to improve students' ability to make informed decisions and legitimize their credibility with clients, co-workers, and partners. The MLS can be completed in as little as 15 months and does not require a GRE/LSAT.

Costs and student debt
The total cost of attendance (indicating the cost of tuition, fees, and living expenses) at WCL for the 2021–2022 academic year is $82,842. The Law School Transparency estimated debt-financed cost of attendance for three years is $293,573. According to U.S. News & World Report, the average indebtedness of 2020 AUWCL graduates who incurred law school debt was $159,723 (not including undergraduate debt), and 76% of 2020 graduates took on debt.

Employment outcomes
According to WCL's official 2020 ABA-required disclosures, 61.8% of the class of 2020 obtained full-time, long-term, JD-required employment nine months after graduation, and 15% were employed in J.D.-preferred positions. Thirteen percent of the class of 2020 were seeking employment 9 months after graduation.

Publications

Notes and recognition
The National Jurist, in its 100 Best Law Review rankings, placed the American University Law Review 47th and the International Law Review 84th. 
Administrative Law Review is the official publication of the American Bar Association Section of Administrative Law and Regulatory Practice.
In 2005, the ABA recognized "The Business Law Brief" (since promoted to The American University Business Law Review) as the "Magazine of the Year."
On several occasions, the ABA has recognized The American Jurist as the "Best Law Student Magazine."

Noted people

Notable current and former faculty

Notable alumni

Judiciary

Federal

State

Politics and government

Federal

State

International

Education, business, media, and entertainment

References

External links
Washington College of Law website

American University
Washington College of Law (American University)
Former women's universities and colleges in the United States
Educational institutions established in 1896
1896 establishments in Washington, D.C.